Phillip Berry may refer to:

Phillip O. Berry Academy of Technology
Phillip S. Berry, president of the Sierra Club

See also
Philip Berry